The National Institute for Implementation Research in Non Communicable Diseases, Jodhpur came into existence on 07th December 2019. The institute is located in Jodhpur and it replaces the erstwhile Desert Medicine Research Centre. The institute conducts basic laboratory based research in its microbiology, biochemistry and vector biology laboratories. At present, the institute has a set of 10 scientists, 9 technical experts, supported by 28 administrative and support staff. The thrust areas of research are cardiovascular diseases, chronic respiratory diseases, environmental health, nutritional disorders, cancers, injury & trauma, mental illnesses including substance abuse, genetic diseases and other non-communicable diseases of public health significance in India. The institute aspires to carry out implementation research in the thrust areas, provide training for capacity building in implementation research in other academic and research institutions, develop behavior change communication materials and models for tackling risk factors of various non communicable diseases.

References

 

Medical research in India
[[Category:National 

Research institutes in Rajasthan]]
Indian Council of Medical Research